Salsa most often refers to:

 Salsa (Mexican cuisine), a variety of sauces used as condiments
 Salsa music, a popular style of Latin American music
 Salsa (dance), a Latin dance associated with Salsa music

Salsa or SALSA may also refer to:

Arts and entertainment
 Salsa (film), a 1988 American romance film 
 Salsa, a TV series program on Georgia Public Broadcasting
 Salsa, a 2000 album by Celia Cruz 
 Salsa (EP), by Residual Kid, 2016
 Salsa, a character in the video game Mother 3
 Salsa, a character in the video game Eternal Sonata

Transportation
 Salsa d'Haïti, a Haitian regional airline
 SEAT Salsa, a concept car
 Salsa, a satellite in the Cluster II mission
 Salsa Cycles, an American bicycle brand

Other uses
 La Salsa, an American casual dining restaurant chain
 Salsa's Fresh Mex Grill, an Australian chain of fast-food restaurants
 Salsa family of stream ciphers, particularly Salsa20
 SALSA (food standard), a British food standard
 Salsa (spider), a genus of spiders in the family Araneidae

See also

 Salza (disambiguation)